The 1881 Iowa gubernatorial election was held on October 11, 1881. Republican nominee Buren R. Sherman defeated Democratic nominee L. G. Kinne with 56.72% of the vote.

General election

Candidates
Major party candidates
Buren R. Sherman, Republican
L. G. Kinne, Democratic 

Other candidates
D. M. Clark, Greenback

Results

References

1881
Iowa